Charles Vernon France (30 June 1868 – 13 April 1949) was a British actor, usually credited as C. V. France.

Stage career
France appeared (along with Ralph Richardson) in William Somerset Maugham's 1932 play For Services Rendered: A Play in Three Acts and Maurice Baring's 1912 drama The Grey Stocking: A Play in Four Acts.

France's stage acting was singled out for praise in Maugham's 1938 literary memoir, The Summing Up: "…But there is one actor whom, since he has never reached the rank of a star, and so has hardly received the recognition that he deserves, I should like to mention. This is C. V. France. He has acted in several of my plays. He has never played a part in which he has not been admirable. He has represented to the smallest particular the character that I had in my mind’s eye. It would be difficult to find on the English stage a more competent, intelligent, and versatile actor".

Complete filmography

 The Blue Bird (1910, short) – Time
 Eugene Aram (1924) – Squire Lester
 The Burgomaster of Stilemonde (1929) 
 The Loves of Robert Burns (1930) – Lord Farquhar
 The Skin Game (1931) – Mr. Hillcrist – The Hillcrists
 These Charming People (1931) – Minx
 Black Coffee (1931) – Sir Claude Amory
 A Night Like This (1932) – Micky the Mailer
 Lord Edgware Dies (1934) – Lord Edgware
 Royal Cavalcade (1935) – Father
 Scrooge (1935) – Spirit of Christmas Future
 Tudor Rose (1936) – Clergy at Execution (uncredited)
 Broken Blossoms (1936) – High Priest
 Crime Over London (1936) – (uncredited)
 Victoria the Great (1937) – Archbishop of Canterbury
 A Yank at Oxford (1938) – Dean Snodgrass
 Strange Boarders (1938) – Col. Lionel Anstruther
 If I Were King (1938) – Father Villon
 The Ware Case (1938) – Judge
 Cheer Boys Cheer (1939) – Tom Greenleaf
 Ten Days in Paris (1940) – General de Guermantes
 Night Train to Munich (1940) – Admiral Hassinger
 Breach of Promise (1942) – Morgan
 Went the Day Well? (1942) – Mr Ashton, the vicar
 The Halfway House (1944) – Mr. Truscott, Solicitor
 It Happened One Sunday (1944) – Magistrate (final film role)

External links

1868 births
1949 deaths
English male film actors
Male actors from Bradford
People from Gerrards Cross
20th-century English male actors